"How Far?" is a song by British virtual band Gorillaz, featuring Tony Allen and Skepta. The track was released on 2 May 2020 without any prior announcement as the fourth single for Gorillaz' seventh studio album, Song Machine, Season One: Strange Timez. It is part of the Song Machine project, a web series involving the ongoing release of various Gorillaz singles and music videos featuring different guest musicians over the course of 2020, though it is not considered an official episode of the series. The single marks the first posthumously released material featuring Tony Allen (which was released two days after Allen's death), as well as the final song to be recorded during Allen's lifetime.

Background
"How Far?" was written and recorded in the weeks prior to lockdown as a result of the COVID-19 pandemic. It was the last song from the album to be recorded in studio before lockdown was ordered.

On 30 April 2020, Tony Allen, an afrobeat drummer featured on the song, died of abdominal aortic aneurysm at the age of 79. Allen had previously worked with Gorillaz founder, Damon Albarn, through a band called The Good, the Bad & the Queen, where both participated as members of through the 2000s.

Without any prior announcement, "How Far?" released a few days later on 2 May 2020, as a standalone audio with no accompanying video or episodic EP like other Song Machine releases. According to a press release, the song was released as an official tribute to Allen.

Tracklist

Personnel

Gorillaz
 Damon Albarn – instrumentation, director, keyboards, guitar, melodica
 Jamie Hewlett – artwork, character design, video direction
 Stephen Sedgwick – mixing engineer, engineering
 Remi Kabaka Jr. – percussion
 John Davis – mastering engineer
 Samuel Egglenton – engineering

Additional musicians
 Tony Allen – vocals, drums
 Skepta – vocals
 Kotono Sato – violin
 Stella Page – viola 
 Ciara Ismail – violin
 Izzi Dunn – cello
Additional artwork
 Bernard Benant – photography

References

2020 singles
2020 songs
Gorillaz songs
Skepta songs
Song Machine
Songs released posthumously
Songs written by Damon Albarn
Songs written by Remi Kabaka Jr.
Songs written by Skepta
Parlophone singles
Warner Records singles
English rock songs